Shaun Ross (born December 11, 1968) is a bassist from Venice, California, and former member of Excel, a band he performed with from 1985 until its dissolution. He took his first inspirations from very different kinds of music, like Rudimentary Peni, Jungle Brothers, Sly and the Family Stone and Deep Purple. Also he released an EP with the Thrash metal group Hirax in 2001.

History
Ross grew up in the western region of Los Angeles, influenced by many different musicians and genres, from the punk movement and hard rock even to soul, funk and jazz fusion bands. At the age 15 years he started playing bass and founded a graffiti crew called "Kings Stop at Nothing". In 1985 his friends Dan Clements and Adam Siegel told him they needed a new bassist for their crossover thrash group "Chaotic Noise", and he was the "best for the job". When Ross took over the four strings, "Chaotic Noise" changed its name to the one that he created in "Kings Stop at Nothing", Excel. Clements printed posters to find a new drummer, and a few weeks later he received a call from Greg Saenz, who would become the fourth member of the band. They recorded 3 demos between 1985 and 1986 (Sonic Decapitation, Personal Onslaught and Refuse to Quit), editing their first studio album (Split Image) in 1987 (the recording was paid by Mike Muir and distribution was conducted by Caroline Records), the second one (The Joke's on You) in 1989, and a tour in Netherlands the same year with that line-up. In 1990 Adam Siegel left Excel to join the side project founded by Mike Muir, Infectious Grooves; when he returned in 1992, the band recorded a fifth and last demo titled Third album demos, then Adam Excel left definitely th band together Greg Saenz to form the power-trio My Head. The group remained on a hiatus until 1995, when Clements hired Brandon Rudley (guitarist) and "Max" (drummer) to release a third studio album called Seeking Refuge. Then Excel broke up for good. In 2001 Shaun joined Thrash Metal band Hirax, he only participated in the EP "Barrage of Noise".

Discography

Excel
See also: Excel discography and List of Excel demos(Shaun participated in all Excel's releases)

Hirax

References

External links 
Excel Official Web

Excel (band) members
1968 births
American heavy metal bass guitarists
American male bass guitarists
Guitarists from California
Living people
20th-century American guitarists